Lalbaba College, established in 1964, is an undergraduate college in Howrah, India. It is affiliated with the University of Calcutta.

Departments

Science

Chemistry
Physics
Mathematics
Geography

Arts and Commerce

Bengali
Hindi
Sanskrit
English
Urdu
History
Political Science
Philosophy
Education
Economics
Commerce

Online Admission 

Accreditation
The college is recognized by the University Grants Commission (UGC). In 2004 it was accredited by the National Assessment and Accreditation Council (NAAC), and awarded B+ grade, the college is now preparing for its next re-accreditation.|

See also 
List of colleges affiliated to the University of Calcutta
Education in India
Education in West Bengal

References

External links
http://lalbabacollege.net

Educational institutions established in 1964
University of Calcutta affiliates
Universities and colleges in Howrah district
1964 establishments in West Bengal